Hypocalymma minus is a member of the family Myrtaceae endemic to Western Australia.

The open shrub is found along the south coast in the South West and Great Southern regions of Western Australia.

References

minus
Endemic flora of Western Australia
Rosids of Western Australia
Plants described in 2013
Taxa named by Gregory John Keighery